Clemelis pullata is a species of fly in the family Tachinidae. This family consists of  dipteran tachina flies, which are protelean parasitoids of arthropods.

This species (previously called Zenillia pullata) is said to have the world's smallest insect eggs, with dimensions of 0.027 by 0.02 mm (about 8 nanograms).

References

Diptera of Europe
Diptera of Asia
Insects described in 1824
Tachinidae